Ronald Brooks, better known by his stage name Money-B, is an American rapper, best known for being a member of the funk and rap group Digital Underground.  He is a member of Raw Fusion with DJ Fuze whom they had two albums, Live From the Styleetron and Hoochified Funk.

He had a solo album named Talkin' Dirty which features Digital Underground released in 1999.

Money-B contributed, edited the script and acted as himself for the Digital Underground portion of the 2017 Tupac biopic All Eyez on Me.

Discography
Solo albums
1999: Talkin' Dirty
2007: Mandatory Vol. 1
2009: 4 Tha Funk Of It

Collaboration albums
1991: Live from the Styleetron (with Raw Fusion)
1994: Hoochiefied Funk (with Raw Fusion)

Guest appearances
1992: "Call It What You Want" (with Above The Law feat. 2Pac & Money-B)
2010: "The Club" (with Big Bossolo) album The Birth

References

External links

Music videos and lyrics

American male rappers
Place of birth missing (living people)
Rappers from the San Francisco Bay Area
Living people
21st-century American rappers
21st-century American male musicians
1969 births